Anathix aggressa is a species of cutworm or dart moth in the family Noctuidae. It is found in North America.

The MONA or Hodges number for Anathix aggressa is 9963.

References

Further reading

 
 
 

Xylenini
Articles created by Qbugbot
Moths described in 1907